Barbu, also known as Tafferan, is a trick-taking, compendium card game similar to hearts, in which four players take turns leading seven different sub-games (known as contracts) over the course of 28 deals. Barbu originated in France in the early 20th century where it was especially popular with university students, and became a prominent game among French bridge players in the 1960s. The French version of the game was originally played with a stripped deck of 32 cards ranked seven to ace in each suit. Modern forms are played with a full 52-card deck. Barbu may be descended from earlier compendium games popular with students and originating in the Austro-Hungarian Empire such as Lorum or Quodlibet.

Barbu literally means 'the bearded [man]', a reference to the common depiction of the king of hearts, which is the only heart with a beard. This card is of special significance in one of the seven contracts featured in the game.

Rules

Preliminaries
Four players (no partnerships) use a deck of 52 French suited cards (♠  ♣ ) ranking A (high) K Q J 10 9 8 7 6 5 4 3 2 (low). There are 28 deals in a game and each player deals seven times in succession, the deal passing to the left. Players draw for high card to determine who will be the first dealer. The dealer is automatically also the declarer. He shuffles the cards, offers them to the right for cutting and then deals 13 cards to each player. He then names which contract all will play for that deal. The declarer names each contract once only. After having played all seven contracts, the roles of dealer and declarer pass to the left for the next seven hands, and so on, until all have done their seven contracts.

Contracts 
There are five negative and two positive contracts and all are trick-taking games with the exception of domino. For trick-taking contracts, declarer leads a card to the opening trick and play passes clockwise with each player following suit if able, or otherwise playing a card in a different suit. All contracts are played at no trump, with the exception of trumps. The total scores for all seven contracts taken together add up to zero, although variations exist where this is not the case . The seven contracts are:

Each trick taken scores −2 points for a total of −26.
 No hearts. The ace of hearts scores −6 and each of the other hearts score −2 for a total of −30. Hearts may never be led unless there are no cards of other suits available to lead. All hearts are kept face up after capture so that everybody can see who has taken which.
 No queens. Each queen scores −6 for a total of −24 and queens are left face up after capture. The hand ends once all four queens have been taken.
 No king of hearts (Barbu). K scores −20, and hearts may not be led as in the no-hearts contract above. Play ends once the king has been taken.
 No last two. The second-to-last trick scores −10 and the last trick scores −20 for −30 points.
 Trumps. Declarer chooses trumps and leads to the first trick. If a trump is led, each player must, if able, play a higher trump than those played before. Otherwise players follow suit, or discard if they are void in trumps. If a plain suit is led, players follow suit if possible. If they cannot and no trump has been played, they must play a trump card if possible or otherwise play a card of one of the other suits. If a non-trump has been led and trumped, a player must, if possible, play a higher trump than those previously played. Otherwise the player may slough off any card. Each trick scores +5 points for +65 total.
Domino.  Declarer chooses a starting rank (which he need not have) and announces "Domino from the [rank]." Each player in turn must play any card of the chosen rank or cards one higher or lower in rank than those on the table. Failing that, a player must pass. The aim is to be first to shed all of one's cards. The layout of the Domino is thus built from a column of the four starting cards that sequence outward to one or both sides. Play continues until all cards have been laid out onto the table. First to go out scores +45, second scores +20, third +5 and last −5, for +65 total.

Doubling

After declarer picks a game but before the first trick is led, each of the other players may wager double against one or more of the other players. This operates like a side bet on the relative game score between the two players, who are said to have "business" with each other. The rules for doubling are:
Each player gets one opportunity to double, starting with the player at the dealer's left
A player must name which of the other players he or she wishes to double, or say "maximum" or "table" to double all of the players, or "family" or "flanks" to double the other two non-dealers.
At a positive game, non-dealers may only double the dealer (who may redouble)
Each non-declarer must double against declarer at least twice during a declarer's seven contracts.
Any player receiving a wager of double may redouble; "maximum" implies redoubling all received wagers as well as doubling the remaining players
Declarer can not double, but may redouble as above. A "maximum" from the dealer therefore redoubles received wagers only
If there are no doubles in a negative game, the game is not played out, but the negative points are simply divided equally between the non-dealers, with the dealer scoring 0 or +1 as necessary.
After the hand is played out and scores are tallied, modifications are made for doubles as follows:
Between each pair of players who doubled, the difference in their scores is calculated. Player with the higher score for that round is awarded the amount of the difference and player with the lower score had the same amount subtracted from his or her score.
Redoubled wagers are figured the same way, with the difference in scores doubled before awards and penalties are tallied.

Game

Once all 28 hands have been played, scores are tallied and the player with the greatest number of points wins. The scores of all players should add up to zero, though variations exist where this is not the case (see below).

Variations

Additional contracts 
Ravage city
Ravage city is an eighth contract (resulting in a game of 32 deals) where the player who takes the most cards in any one suit scores −24. If two tie, each scores −12. If three tie, each scores −8, and all get −6 for a four-way tie.  To maintain zero-sum scoring, the values of the other contracts are modified as follows:
No tricks: each trick scores −3 (−39 total)
No hearts: no change – ace of  scores −6, all other s score −2 each (−30 total)
No queens: each queen scores −8 (−32 total)
No king: King of  scores −21
No Last Two: no change – penultimate trick scores −10, ultimate trick scores −20 (−30 total)
Trumps: each trick scores +7 (+91 total)
Domino: first player out scores +50, second +25, third 10 and last scores 0 (+85 total)
Otherwise all is as in the seven contract version.

Some play ravage city at −36 instead of −24. This does not maintain the zero-sum scoring.

Chinese poker 
Chinese poker (chipoker) is a ninth contract (making 36 deals) played and scored as a hand of Chinese poker. The scores are then multiplied by four, for 76 plus points. Played with ravage city and all other deals, chipoker adds 52 positive points into the game. All the negative games may be slightly adjusted to balance out the games and make the total scores add up to 0.

 Salad 
In this game the five negative rounds are varied slightly as follows, and the salad is a sixth round.

No tricks: Each trick scores −5 (total −65 with 4 players)
No last trick: −30 total (note, just last trick)
No hearts: All hearts score −10 (−130 total)
No queens: Each queen scores −20 (−80 total)
No Barbu: K scores −50
Salad: all of the above, simultaneously (−235 total with 4 players)

Games are multiples of six rounds, with strategy for salad being critical. This variant is strictly for fun – for example, players will gang up on the leader going into the salad, forgetting their own position.  It allows other numbers of participants to play by adjusting the pack (e.g., five players can be accommodated by removing the black 2s from the pack, leaving 50 cards).

Quick rotation barbu
Some play with a new declarer and dealer each round instead of every seven rounds. This makes for more varied play, but requires precise recording of who has declared what and who has doubled whom.  This is often more exciting, as you have a chance to get back into the running late in the game, even if you are the first to deal.

Marketed variations 
Many game manufacturers have published boxed games based on Barbu. These include Parker Brothers's 6-contract game Coup d'Etat (1966) using a 32-card deck and scoreboard with tiny plastic swords, and Milton Bradley's fantasy-themed Dragonmaster (1981) that keeps score with colored plastic jewels,

See also
Hearts
Trex (card game)

References

External links
Barbu website Online game
Barbu website Description of the game, outline of strategy, and links to other pages, including those with variant rules

Barbu scoresheets
Sample scoresheet at pagat for download
Dynamic barbu spreadsheet for Excel or Open Office Calc
Dynamic (Yale) variant scoresheet in Google Docs for online scoring or download to Excel or Open Office Calc

20th-century card games
French card games
Four-player card games
Compendium games
Year of introduction missing